Arctostaphylos montaraensis, known by the common name Montara manzanita, is a species of manzanita in the family Ericaceae.

Distribution 
This perennial evergreen shrub is endemic to California, native only to a few occurrences in northern San Mateo County on San Bruno Mountain and Montara Mountain, northern extensions of the Santa Cruz Mountains.

The plant is ranked as a critically endangered species by the California Native Plant Society Inventory of Rare and Endangered Plants of California, due to being threatened by new developments and off trail/road walking and vehicle (e.g. motorcycles, mountain bikes) habitat degradation.

Description 
The multiple trunks and stems have a deep reddish−brown bark. The twigs and nascent inflorescence axis are coated in glandular bristles. The shrub has a dense foliage of light gray−green glandular leaves, rough and dull in texture, and up to 4 or 5 centimeters long.

The inflorescence is a dense cluster of cone-shaped manzanita flowers, each white in color, and just under a centimeter long and with bristles inside. The flowering period is January through March.

Cultivation 
Arctostaphylos montaraensis is cultivated as a chaparral landscaping plant, for California native plant, drought tolerant, and natural habitat gardens.

See also 
 California coastal sage and chaparral ecoregion

References

External links 
Calflora Database: Arctostaphylos montaraensis (Montara manzanita)
Jepson Manual eFlora (TJM2) treatment of Arctostaphylos montaraensis
USDA Plants Profile for Arctostaphylos montaraensis
UC CalPhotos gallery of Arctostaphylos montaraensis images

montaraensis
Endemic flora of California
Endemic flora of the San Francisco Bay Area
Natural history of the California chaparral and woodlands
Natural history of the California Coast Ranges
Natural history of San Mateo County, California
~
Plants described in 1967
Taxa named by Alice Eastwood
Garden plants of North America
Drought-tolerant plants
Critically endangered flora of California